Marguerite-D'Youville is a former provincial electoral district in the Montérégie region of Quebec, Canada that elected members to the National Assembly of Quebec. As of its final election, it consisted of the cities of Boucherville and Sainte-Julie.

It was created for the 1994 election from Bertrand and named after Saint Marie-Marguerite d'Youville, founder of the Order of Sisters of Charity of the Hôpital Général of Montreal.  Its final election was in 2008.  It disappeared in the 2012 election and the successor electoral district was Montarville.

In the 1995 Quebec referendum it voted 59% for Quebec to separate.

Members of the National Assembly
François Beaulne, Parti Québécois (1994–2003)
Pierre Moreau, Liberal (2003–2007)
Simon-Pierre Diamond, Action démocratique (2007–2008)
Monique Richard, Parti Québécois (2008–2012)

Election results

|-
 
|Liberal
|Jean-Robert Grenier
|align="right"|13,119
|align="right"|35.88
|align="right"|+8.68

|-

|-

|}

|-
 
|Liberal
|Pierre Moreau
|align="right"|11,401
|align="right"|27.20
|align="right"|-14.18
|-

|}
* Increase is from UFP

References

External links
Information
 Elections Quebec

Election results
 Election results (National Assembly)
 Election results (Elections Quebec)

Maps
 2001 map (Flash)
2001–2011 changes (Flash)
1992–2001 changes (Flash)
 Electoral map of Montérégie region (as of 2001)
 Quebec electoral map, 2001

Boucherville
Marguerite-Dyouville